Helene Marie Stromeyer (26 August 1834 – 13 March 1924) was a German painter known for her floral and landscape paintings.

Biography
Stromeyer was born on 26 August 1834 in Hanover. The surgeon Louis Stromeyer was her father. In the 1880s she attended the Großherzoglich Badische Kunstschule (Academy of Fine Arts, Karlsruhe) where she was taught by Hans Gude and Gustav Schönleber.

Stromeyer exhibited her work at the Woman's Building at the 1893 World's Columbian Exposition in Chicago, Illinois.

She was a member of the Düsseldorf School of Painting and the Karlsruhe Artists' Association. By the end of her life, Stromeyer was considered one of the most important still life painters of her time.

Stromeyer died on 13 March 1924 in Karlsruhe.

Gallery

References

External links
  
 images of Stromeyer's work on ArtNet

1834 births
1924 deaths
German women painters
19th-century German women artists
20th-century German women artists
19th-century German painters
20th-century German painters